Kitwiru is an administrative ward in the Iringa Urban district of the Iringa Region of Tanzania. In 2016 the Tanzania National Bureau of Statistics report there were 11,992 people in the ward, from 11,461 in 2012.

Neighborhoods 
The ward has 14 neighborhoods.

 Cagliero
 Kibwabwa 'A'
 Kibwabwa 'B'
 Kisiwani
 Kitwiru 'A'
 Kitwiru 'B'
 Mosi
 Nyamhanga 'A'
 Nyamhanga 'B'
 Nyamhanga 'C'
 Nyamhanga 'D'
 Nyamhanga 'E'
 Uyole 'A'
 Uyole 'B'

References 

Wards of Iringa Region
Constituencies of Tanzania